

The Radioplane OQ-12 was a target drone in the United States, manufactured by the Radioplane company.

The OQ-12 was most likely intended as a competitor to the Simmonds Aerocessories OQ-11, and it first flew in October 1941, but remained a prototype only.

See also

References

External links

1940s United States special-purpose aircraft
Unmanned aerial vehicles of the United States